Rebecca  is a biblical matriarch.

Rebecca, or similar, may also refer to:

Geography 
 Rebecca, Georgia, United States

People with the name
 Rebecca (given name)
 List of people named Rebecca
 Rebekah (DJ), producer of industrial techno
 Rebeca Pous Del Toro (born 1978), known professionally as Rebeca, Spanish singer
 Rebekah Johnson (born 1976), also known as Rebekah, American singer-songwriter

Arts, entertainment, and media

Literature
 Rebecca (novel), a 1938 novel by Daphne du Maurier
 Rebecca of Sunnybrook Farm, a 1903 children's novel by Kate Douglas Wiggin
 Rebekah (novel), a 2001 novel by Orson Scott Card

Films
  Rebecca (1940 film), a 1940 film directed by Alfred Hitchcock based on du Maurier's novel
 Rebecca, a 1952 Filipino film starring Tessie Agana and Van De Leon
 Rebecca (1963 film), a Malayalam film directed by Kunchacko
  Rebecca (2016 film), a Ghana-Nigeria film directed by Shirley Frimpong-Manso
  Rebecca (2020 film), a British Netflix original film directed by Ben Wheatley based on du Maurier's novel

Songs
 "Rebecca", a 2011 song by the Russian band Tesla Boy
 "Rebecca Came Back from Mecca," a 1921 song popular in the United States
 "Rebecca," a song on the 1975 Flo and Eddie album, Illegal, Immoral and Fattening
 "Rebecca," a song on the 2016 Against Me! Album, "Shape Shift With Me"
 "Rebeca", a song by Johnny Ventura Y Su Combo Show 1984 
 "Rebeca", a song by Enanitos Verdes from Néctar (album)
 "Rebeca", a song by MC Livinho, Gerek and Maejor 2018

Television
 Rebeca (telenovela), a 2003 Spanish-language telenovela
  Rebecca (1979 TV series), 1979 serial directed by Simon Langton based on du Maurier's novel
  Rebecca (1997 TV series), 1997 serial directed by Jim O'Brien based on du Maurier's novel
 "Rebecca" (Better Call Saul), an episode

Other uses in arts, entertainment, and media
 Rebecca (band), a 1980s Japanese pop band fronted by Nokko
 Rebecca (musical), a 2006 musical by Michael Kunze and Sylvester Levay
 Rebecca, a steam locomotive in the television series Thomas & Friends.

Computing and technology
 Rebeca (programming language), an actor-based programming language
 Rebecca/Eureka transponding radar, a Second World War aircraft homing and distance measuring system
 "RebeccaPurple", a hex color (#663399 ), used in various computer technologies

Other uses 
 Rebecca Hair Products, Chinese manufacturer of hair products
 Hurricane Rebecca, tropical and subtropical cyclones named either Rebecca or Rebekah
 International Association of Rebekah Assemblies, a service organization
 Rabeca, a fiddle from northeastern Brazil and northern Portugal
 Rebecca (raccoon), a pet raccoon kept by president Calvin Coolidge
 Rebecca, a genus of algae in the order Pavlovales
 Rebecca, a Mitsubishi Canter modified truck
 Rebecca Riots of nineteenth-century South Wales
 Rebec, sometimes rebecha, rebeckha, a bowed string instrument of the Medieval and early Renaissance eras

See also 
 Becca, a female given name
 Becki (disambiguation)
 Becky (disambiguation)
 Rivkah (disambiguation)